List of bridges in London lists the major bridges within Greater London or within the influence of London. Most of these are river crossings, and the best-known are those across the River Thames. Several bridges on other rivers have given their names to areas of London, particularly where the whole river has become subterranean. Other bridges are high level road or rail crossings across other streets.

River crossings

River Thames
Bridges over the River Thames, listed in order travelling from East to West. Multiple values in "Dates opened" pertain to earlier bridges at the site of the current structure.

River Lea
Lea Bridge
Lower Lea Crossing

Subterranean rivers
Knightsbridge across the River Westbourne
Stamford Bridge across Counter's Creek

Canals and docks
Merchant Square Footbridge
The Rolling Bridge
Royal Victoria Dock Bridge

Road and foot bridges

Archway, London
Bishop's Bridge
Croydon Flyover
Hammersmith Flyover
Holborn Viaduct across Fleet River
Three Bridges
White Horse Bridge

Railway bridges
Arnos Park Viaduct
Dollis Brook Viaduct
Kingsland Viaduct
Wharncliffe Viaduct

The Illuminated River
In 2016 an international competition was launched to design a public artwork in Central London across 15 bridges on the River Thames, from Tower Bridge to Albert Bridge, with a minimum lifespan of 10 years.
A design by American artist Leo Villareal in collaboration with British architects Lifschutz Davidson Sandilands was selected from 105 entries by an independent competition jury in November 2016. This will be one of the UK's largest ever public art commissions. 

The first phase - Southwark Bridge, Millennium Bridge, London Bridge and Cannon Street Bridge - was switched on in July 2019. The Illuminated River artwork was completed in April 2021 with the illumination of Blackfriars Bridge, Waterloo Bridge, Golden Jubilee Footbridges, Westminster Bridge and Lambeth Bridge. The artwork employs LED light fittings, replacing less efficient forms of lighting in places. 

The installation’s colour scheme is in part influenced by famous paintings of the Thames, as noted by The Times: “The colours and tones used in the paintings of those inveterate Thames-watchers Monet, Whistler and Turner provide some of the inspiration, while at Westminster [bridge] a shade of green was chosen to complement the colour of the leather upholstery in the House of Commons”. An article in The Guardian stated: "The project... has been much trickier and taken longer to realise than anticipated." A three-part Channel 4 documentary, which started in July 2019, covered the project up to the end of the first phase.

See also
Tideway
List of crossings of the River Thames
Tunnels underneath the River Thames

References

 List of Bridges in London
Infrastructure in London
London
Bridges
Bridges
London 
Bridge light displays